Howie MacDonald (born March 9, 1965) is a Canadian fiddler and entertainer from Westmount, Cape Breton Island. His lively Cape Breton style of fiddling has entertained audiences all over the world while travelling with The Rankin Family. He has released multiple albums including one with Ashley MacIsaac, capebretonfiddlemusicNOTCALM in 2001.

MacDonald was the Conservative Party of Canada candidate for Sydney—Victoria in the 2004 and 2006 federal elections.

Electoral record

References

1965 births
Living people
Canadian people of Scottish descent
Cape Breton fiddlers
Musicians from Nova Scotia
Canadian male violinists and fiddlers
Conservative Party of Canada candidates for the Canadian House of Commons
Nova Scotia candidates for Member of Parliament
21st-century Canadian violinists and fiddlers
21st-century Canadian male musicians